Skanky Possum was a twice-a-year poetry journal and small book-publishing imprint begun in Austin, Texas and associated with a long-running, home-based poetry reading series. It existed between 1998 and 2012.

History and profile
Skanky Possum was first published in Fall 1998. Curated by Hoa Nguyen and her husband, Dale Smith, the imprint published American poetry, featuring both well known names and up-and-coming poets. Discussing small poetry journals, Linh Dinh observes, "Although most of these are ephemeral, appearing for only a few issues, with tiny circulations, their existence invigorates American literature."

This 11 issue staple-bound magazine published several poems selected for The Best American Poetry series, including four of the 75 poems in the 2002 edition, selected by Robert Creeley. "In poetry circles, their magazine is highly regarded," Crispin Jessa writes in Bookslut, "Skanky Possum has printed the works of Amiri Baraka and Tom Clark." . Poems by Clayton Eshleman, Robert Kelly, Linh Dinh, Eileen Myles, Kenward Elmslie, Rachel Loden, Alice Notley, Anselm Hollo and Diane di Prima have also appeared.

The annual circulation of the magazine was 300 to 500 copies. Smith and Nguyen also published several poetry books under the Skanky Possum imprint including titles by Tom Clark & Anne Waldman, Kristin Prevallet and Sotere Torregian 

Skanky Possum ceased publication in 2012. The editors of the magazine continue to run a reading series in their new home in Toronto.

Trivia

Thurston Moore of the band Sonic Youth sent the magazine a fan letter.

Notes

External links
 Skanky Possum
 Article about Skanky Possum at The Daily Penn, student newspaper at the University of Pennsylvania
 Interview with Hoa Nguyen

Biannual magazines published in the United States
Defunct literary magazines published in the United States
Magazines established in 1998
Magazines disestablished in 2012
Magazines published in Austin, Texas
Poetry magazines published in the United States